Surya Man Dong Tamang was the member of 1st Nepalese Constituent Assembly. He won Kavre–1 seat in CA assembly, 2008 from Unified Communist Party of Nepal (Maoist).

References

Communist Party of Nepal (Maoist Centre) politicians
Living people
1970 births

Members of the 1st Nepalese Constituent Assembly
Nepal MPs 2022–present